A Good Thing Going is a 1978 Australian television film directed by Arch Nicholson. It stars John Hargreaves and won four Logie Awards.

Plot
Phil Harris (Hargreaves) spends more time with his best friend, Terry (Haywood) than with his wife and children. Phil's marriage disintegrates, with his wife (Lang) taking flight and leaving him to care for their distressed children.

Cast
John Hargreaves as Phil Harris
Chris Haywood as Terry
Veronica Lang as Jane Harris
Miles Buchanan as Damien Harris
Simone Buchanan as Cathy Harris
Tina Bursill
Sandra Lee Paterson

Awards
Logie Awards of 1980
Best Lead Actor in a Miniseries/Telemovie - John Hargreaves
Best Supporting Actor in a Miniseries/Telemovie - Chris Haywood
Best Supporting Actress in a Miniseries/Telemovie - Veronica Lang
Best Performance by a Juvenile - Miles Buchanan

References

External links

A Good Thing Going at Peter Malone site

1978 television films
1978 films
Australian drama television films
Films shot in Sydney
1978 drama films
1970s English-language films
Films directed by Arch Nicholson